Junior Burton Ioane (born July 21, 1977) is a former American football defensive tackle.  He attended Arizona State University. He was drafted in the fourth round of the 2000 NFL Draft. He played with the Oakland Raiders during his rookie year in 2000–2003. Ioane also played for the Houston Texans from 2003–2006.

High school career
Ioane attended North Sanpete High School in Mount Pleasant, Utah, where he was a standout in football, basketball, and track and field. In football, he won All-State honors. In track and field, he won the State Champion in the shot put as a senior.

College career
Ioane was an Honorable Mention All-Pac-10 selection in 1999. Prior to attending Arizona State, Ioane played at Snow College in Ephraim, Utah.

In August 2003 he was signed by the Houston Texans.

In May 2006 Ioane was signed by the New York Giants.

References

External links
NFL.com bio

1977 births
Living people
American football defensive linemen
Arizona State Sun Devils football players
Oakland Raiders players
Houston Texans players
Snow Badgers football players
People from Mount Pleasant, Utah
American sportspeople of Samoan descent
Samoan players of American football
Players of American football from Utah
Samoan emigrants to the United States